Mihraç Ural, also known as Ali Kayyali (Arabic:علي كيالي), is a Turkish-Syrian Alawite militant and leader of the Syrian Resistance (formerly known as the Popular Front for the Liberation of the Sanjak of Iskandarun), a pro-Syrian government militia.

History

Ural was born in 1956 into an Arab family in Hatay Province, Turkey. He studied philosophy at Istanbul University.

Ural was detained on 10 March 1978 over a bank robbery and was imprisoned at Adana. He escaped through a 150m tunnel in August 1980. After his escape from prison, he fled to Syria where he was granted Syrian citizenship by Jamil al-Assad. In Syria, Ural ran a splinter faction of the People's Liberation Party-Front of Turkey.

In 1982 he was arrested in Stuttgart, Germany, and spent time in prison. Ural has led the Popular Front for the Liberation of the Sanjak of Iskenderun, now known as the Syrian Resistance, since 1986. He was detained at the Fleury-Mérogis Prison in France in 1988. 

Ural was accused of involvement in the Bayda and Baniyas massacres and the Reyhanlı bombings of May 2013, but denied responsibility. In March 2016 the Syrian jihadist group Ahrar al-Sham wrongly claimed to have killed Ural.

In late January and early February 2018, Ural attended a Russian-sponsored Syrian peace conference in Sochi, Russia. Turkish foreign minister Mevlüt Çavuşoğlu protested his attendance, saying "We want this person’s immediate detention and extradition to Turkey".

Ural was badly injured on 6 July 2019, after his vehicle struck a roadside bomb while travelling along the Latakia-Slinfah road, following which he was flown by helicopter to a government hospital in Damascus. The bombing happened in the context of the 2019 Northwestern Syria offensive, with Syrian rebel group Abu Amara Special Operations Brigade claiming responsibility for the attack.

References

People from Antakya
Turkish people of Syrian descent
Turkish expatriates in Syria
Turkish Arab people
Istanbul University alumni
Turkish criminals
Turkish revolutionaries